A constitutional referendum was held in Suriname on 30 September 1987. Voters were asked to approve the country's new constitution. It provided for a 51-seat unicameral National Assembly elected by proportional representation and a President elected by the National Assembly. Over 96% voted in favour, with a turnout of 62.7%.

Results

References

1987 referendums
Referendums in Suriname
1987 in Suriname
Constitutional referendums